Orontobia is a genus of tiger moths in the family Erebidae. The moths are found in the mountains of West China.

Species 
 Orontobia coelestina (Püngeler, 1904) - Provisional taxonomic position. No male known.
 Orontobia mooseri de Freina, 1997
 Orontobia murzini Dubatolov, 2005
 Orontobia secreta (Draudt, 1931) (=Orontobia dalailama kansuensis de Freina, 1997)
 Orontobia secreta dalailama de Freina, 1997
 Orontobia taglangla de Freina, 1997

References
Natural History Museum Lepidoptera generic names catalog

Arctiina
Moth genera